Rex  may refer to:
Adam Rex (born 1973), American illustrator and author of children's books
George Rex (1765–1839), British-born entrepreneur
Jim Rex (born 1941), the 16th and current South Carolina Superintendent of Education
John Rex (born 1925), British sociologist
Knud Rex (1912–1968), Danish stage and film actor
Ludwig Rex (1888–1979), German film actor of the silent era
Marcus Rex (1886–1971), the last British Resident of Perak during the World War II waged in British Malaya
Rico Rex (born 1976), former German pair skater
Robley Rex (1901–2009), World War I-era veteran and, at the age of 107, one of two remaining U.S. veterans related to the First World War
Simon Rex (born 1974), American actor and comedian
Theresa Rex, Danish actress and singer 

Occupational surnames
Latin-language surnames
English-language surnames